Florian Bohnert (born 9 November 1997) is a Luxembourgian professional footballer who plays as an attacking midfielder or right winger for Bastia and the Luxembourg national football team.

Club career
On 1 January 2023, Bohnert joined Bastia, on a contract until 2025.

International career
Bohnert made his debut for the Luxembourg national team on 31 May 2016.

Career statistics

Club

International

Scores and results list Luxembourg's goal tally first, score column indicates score after each Bohnert goal.

References

External links

Florian Bohnert at Schalke 04's website

1997 births
Living people
Luxembourgian footballers
Association football midfielders
Association football wingers
Luxembourg international footballers
Regionalliga players
Luxembourg National Division players
Ligue 2 players
FC Schalke 04 II players
FK Pirmasens players
1. FSV Mainz 05 II players
FC Progrès Niederkorn players
SC Bastia players
Luxembourgian expatriate footballers
Luxembourgian expatriate sportspeople in Germany
Expatriate footballers in Germany
Luxembourgian expatriate sportspeople in France
Expatriate footballers in France